Plakali is a staple food mainly prepared by the Ahanta and Nzema peoples of the Western region of Ghana. It consists of cassava dough cooked in hot water, and it is similar to banku, another Ghanaian staple food, and fufu. Plakali is eaten with palm nut or groundnut soup.

Ingredients
Cassava Dough
Water
Salt(to taste)

Method Of Preparation
Make a mixture out of dough with water
Stir to ensure it's lump free 
Put on fire and stir till it becomes thick
Add salt and Stir some more 
And make into balls when well cooked after 10mins 
Serve hot with groundnut or palm nut soup

See also 

 Ground nut Soup
 Palm Nut Soup

References

External links  
 National DISH in the World

African cuisine
Ghanaian cuisine
National dishes